RYC may refer to

Rico Jankowski
The Richmond Yacht Club
The Redhouse Yacht Club
The Royal Yacht Squadron, Isle of Wight
The Rivahaven Yacht Club
The Rockcliffe Yacht Club
The Romsey Youth Council
R.Y.C., a 2020 album by British producer Mura Masa